Negros Occidental's 3rd congressional district is one of the six congressional districts of the Philippines in the province of Negros Occidental. It has been represented in the House of Representatives of the Philippines since 1916 and earlier in the Philippine Assembly from 1907 to 1916. The district consists of the cities of Silay, Talisay and Victorias, as well as the adjacent municipalities of Enrique B. Magalona and Murcia. It is currently represented in the 18th Congress by Kiko Benitez of the PDP–Laban.

Representation history

Election results

2022

2019

2016

2013

2010

See also
Legislative districts of Negros Occidental

References

Congressional districts of the Philippines
Politics of Negros Occidental
1907 establishments in the Philippines
Congressional districts of Western Visayas
Constituencies established in 1907